Violets for Your Furs is a 1981 live album by Shirley Horn recorded at the North Sea Jazz Festival.

Reception

The Allmusic review by Scott Yanow stated: "This lesser-known set is up to the same level as Shirley Horn's best-selling Verve sets. Recommended.".

Track listing
 "Love Is Here to Stay" (George Gershwin, Ira Gershwin) - 3:27
 "Georgia on My Mind" (Hoagy Carmichael, Stuart Gorrell) - 7:25
 "Gee, Baby, Ain't I Good to You" (Andy Razaf, Don Redman) - 3:40
 "Lover Man (Oh, Where Can You Be?)" (Jimmy Davis, Roger ("Ram") Ramirez, James Sherman) - 5:18
 "Violets for Your Furs" (Tom Adair, Matt Dennis) - 4:56
 "Baby Won't You Please Come Home" (Charles Warfield, Clarence Williams) - 4:14
 "My Man" (Jacques Charles, Channing Pollack, Albert Willemetz, Maurice Yvain) - 10:16
 "More Than You Know" (Edward Eliscu, Billy Rose, Vincent Youmans) - 4:18
 "I Didn't Know What Time It Was" (Lorenz Hart, Richard Rodgers) - 2:25

Personnel
Shirley Horn - piano, vocals
Charles Ables - electric bass
Billy Hart - drums

References

SteepleChase Records live albums
Shirley Horn live albums
1981 live albums